Alive & Kicking is the fourth album by Japanese singer Nana Mizuki, released on 8 December 2004.

Track listing

Lyrics, composition, arrangement: Toshiro Yabuki 
Innocent Starter
Lyrics: Nana Mizuki
Composition, arrangement: Tsutomu Ohira
Opening theme for anime television Magical Girl Lyrical Nanoha
Fake Angel
Lyrics: Nana Mizuki
Composition, arrangement: Takahiro Iida
  
Lyrics: Toshiro Yabuki 
Composition, arrangement: Tsutomu Ohira
Tears' Night
Lyrics: Yuumao
Composition, arrangement: Noriyasu Agematsu

Lyrics: Toshiro Yabuki 
Composition, arrangement: Tsutomu Ohira
Independent Love Song
Lyrics: Nana Mizuki
Composition, arrangement: Tsutomu Ohira
Take a Shot
Lyrics, composition, arrangement: Toshiro Yabuki 
Insert song for anime television Magical Girl Lyrical Nanoha
Panorama
Lyrics: Nana Mizuki
Composition: Akimitsu Honma
Arrangement: Akimitsu Honma, Tsutomu Ohira
Jump!
Lyrics: Nana Mizuki
Composition, arrangement: Takahiro Iida
Cherish
Lyrics, composition, arrangement: Toshiro Yabuki 
It's in the Bag
Lyrics: Toshiro Yabuki 
Composition: Kenji Kitajima
Arrangement: Tsutomu Ohira
Abilities
Lyrics, composition, arrangement: Toshiro Yabuki 
M.A.M.A
Lyrics: Naoko
Composition, arrangement: Tsutomu Ohira

Charts

External links
  

2004 albums
Nana Mizuki albums